1646 Rosseland, provisional designation , is a stony asteroid from the inner regions of the asteroid belt, approximately 12 kilometers in diameter. It was discovered on 19 January 1939, by Finnish astronomer Yrjö Väisälä at Turku Observatory in Southwest Finland. It was later named after Norwegian astrophysicist Svein Rosseland.

Orbit and classification 

The S-type asteroid orbits the Sun in the inner main-belt at a distance of 2.1–2.6 AU once every 3 years and 8 months (1,324 days). Its orbit has an eccentricity of 0.12 and an inclination of 8° with respect to the ecliptic.

Physical characteristics

Photometry 

American astronomer Richard Binzel obtained the first rotational lightcurve of Rosseland in the early 1980s. It gave a rotation period of 69.2 hours with a brightness variation of 0.13 magnitude. During a survey of presumed slow rotators, photometric observations by Brazilian Cláudia Angeli and colleges gave a period of 69.2 hours and an amplitude of 0.45 magnitude.

Diameter and albedo 

According to the surveys carried out by the Japanese Akari satellite and NASA's Wide-field Infrared Survey Explorer with its subsequent NEOWISE mission, Rosseland measures between 11.48 and 13.49 kilometers in diameter and its surface has an albedo between 0.18 and 0.2253. The Collaborative Asteroid Lightcurve Link assumes a standard albedo for stony asteroids of 0.20 and calculates a diameter of 12.85 kilometers with an absolute magnitude of 11.82.

Naming 

This minor planet was named in honor of renowned Norwegian astrophysicist Svein Rosseland (1894–1985), founder and first director of the Institute for Theoretical Astrophysics in Oslo. His work on the theory of stellar interiors included studies of stellar rotation and stability and the derivation of the Rosseland mean opacity. The lunar crater Rosseland is also named after him. The official  was published by the Minor Planet Center on 20 February 1976.

References

External links 
 Asteroid Lightcurve Database (LCDB), query form (info )
 Dictionary of Minor Planet Names, Google books
 Asteroids and comets rotation curves, CdR – Observatoire de Genève, Raoul Behrend
 Discovery Circumstances: Numbered Minor Planets (1)-(5000) – Minor Planet Center
 
 

001646
Discoveries by Yrjö Väisälä
Named minor planets
19390119